An Ancient Tale may refer to:

 An Ancient Tale: When the Sun Was a God, a 2003 Polish film
 An Ancient Tale (novel), an 1876 novel by Polish writer Józef Ignacy Kraszewski